Leanne Mitchell (born 14 December 1983) is an English  singer and songwriter, best known for winning the first series of The Voice UK on 2 June 2012. Mitchell released her debut solo single "Run to You" on 3 June 2012.

Her debut self-titled album was released in May 2013 and was described as a "huge flop", managing to get to only 134 in the album chart. She was dropped from her label in 2014.

Career

Early career
At the age of 15 she started performing at Potters Leisure Resort, near Hopton-on-Sea.  Leanne went on to be a regular lead in many Potters Theatre Company productions and was lead vocalist for the Theatre Company before leaving due to her success on 'The Voice' Mitchell writes music, sings, and plays piano and the organ.

2012: The Voice UK

Leanne auditioned for the first ever series of The Voice UK with Beyoncé's If I Were A Boy, having made Tom Jones and Danny O'Donoghue turn their chairs for her, but she chose to join Team Tom. In the Battle Rounds, she was paired up with Barbara Bryceland to sing Lady Gaga's The Edge of Glory, which she won, therefore proceeding to the live shows. In Week 1, she performed P!nk's Who Knew and won the public vote, alongside Ruth Brown and Adam Isaac, moving on the next show. In Week 3, she performed I Put A Spell On You, but ended up in the bottom 3 after they lost to Ruth Brown, who won the vote. Tom Jones chose to save Leanne, taking her to the Semi-Finals. In the Semis, she performed Whitney Houston's Run to You and won the public vote against Ruth Brown. In the Live Finals, she first sang It's a Man's Man's Man's World as her solo song, her duet with coach Tom Jones being Mama Told Me Not to Come and her Song of the Series was yet again, Run to You. She was pronounced as the winner and soon released a cover version of Run to You as her debut single.

Personal life
In 2011, she married activity instructor Rob Hurren, whom she had met 10 years earlier at Potters Leisure Resort. The couple live in Oulton Broad, Lowestoft.

Performances

Discography

Studio albums

Singles

Guest appearances

References

External links
Profile at BBC The Voice UK

1983 births
Living people
People from Lowestoft
The Voice (franchise) winners
The Voice UK contestants
People from Waveney District
21st-century English women singers
21st-century English singers